Debela gora (Serbian: Дебела гора) is a mountain in central Serbia, above the town of Lučani. Its highest peak Branojevac has an elevation of 791 meters above sea level.

References

Mountains of Serbia